Polvo carnavalero (English title: A Carnival Affair) is a Colombian telenovela based on the 2016 film of the same title written by Dago García. It stars Rafael Zea, Johanna Cure, Beto Villa Jr., Víctor Hugo Morant, Sergio Borrero and Patricia Tamayo. It premiered on Caracol Televisión on January 10, 2017 and concluded on May 19, 2017.

Cast 
 Rafael Zea as Alejandro "Alejo" Mallarino Otero
 Johanna Cure as Elizabeth "Eli" Abuabara de Mallarino
 Isabela Córdoba as María José "Majo" Santamaría
 Beto Villa Jr. as Ramón de Jesús "Moncho" Abuabara
 Pedro Palacio as Bonifacio "Bony" del Cristo Martínez Botero
 Patricia Tamayo as Beatriz "Betty" Otero
 Stefany Escobar as Beatriz Otero (young)
 Nestor Alfonso Rojas - Teófilo "Teo" Martínez "Pelucavieja"
 Jaime Enrique Serrano as Teófilo "Teo" Martínez "Pelucavieja" (young)
 Víctor Hugo Morant as Julio Santamaría (owner of the Santamaría Clinic)
 Jennifer Steffens as Patricia "Paty" Pumarejo
 Emilia Ceballos as Lorna Martínez Botero
 Keri Bunkers as Linda Palma
 Luly Bossa as Lola "Loly" María Botero Pumarejo
 Rodrigo Castro as Gustavo Adolfo Gómez Mejía (psychologist)
 Martha Osorio as Bárbara Grimaldi Gómez
 Emerson Rodríguez as Dr. Fernando Bocanegra (doctor)
 Sergio Borrero as himself
 José Rojas as the doctor
 Alexandra Serrano as Emiliana
 Hugo Luis Urruchurto as Paragüita
 Francisco Rueda as Francisco "Pacho"
 Santiago Bejarano as Teófilo's lawyer
 Felipe Galofre as Ricardo Forero (timid employee of María José) #1
 Tuto Patiño as Ricardo Forero (timid employee of María José) #2
 Eileen Roca as Dr. Sol Prieto Paolo (psychologist)
 Claudia Martínez as Elizabeth's friend at the university
 Natalia Salazar as Margarita (secretary)
 María Claudia Torres as Simona Matamoros
 Julieth Arrieta as Alejo's client
 Marco Gómez as Felipe Godinez
 Bernardo García as Santiago Goyoneche
 Manuela Valdés Ruiz as Margarita Rueda "Marguie" 
 Christophe de Geest as Mike 
 Fernando Bocanegra as Martín 
 Yipsy González as Julio's dance teacher
 Laura Lara as Carmenza (secretary)
 Kristina Lilley as Ester "Estersita" 
 Margarita Amado as Pepa
 Andres Mejía as system engineer
 Juan Carlos Solarte as sergeant Trespalacios
 Valentina Lizcano as Deyanira / Renata Concepción Roncancio De los Arrayanes (secretary)
 Marcelo Castro as Toño (Alejandro's companion of spiritual retreat)
 Antonio Di Conza as Usmail
 Ricardo Vesga as Maestro Camilo
 Félix Mercado as Bonny's partner and the theater student of Goyoneche
 Walter Luengas as Virgilio (Renata's ex-wife)
 Jennifer Ochoa
 Patricia Castaño as Margarita's mother
 Gerardo Calero as Aristóteles Nepomuceno Urrutia
 Frank Solano as Domingo (presenter of Todos con la arenosa)
 Astrid Junguito as Concha "Conchita" (Aristóteles' friend)
 Álvaro García as the resident of La Abadía de los Santos
 Luis Miguel Hurtado as Abogado Roncancio
 Arnold Cantillo as Guillermo "Guillo"
 Freddy Ordóñez as María José's partner
 Juan Pablo Acosta
 Christian Gómez as priest

References

External links 
 

2017 telenovelas
2017 Colombian television series debuts
2017 Colombian television series endings
Caracol Televisión telenovelas
Colombian telenovelas
Spanish-language telenovelas
Television shows set in Bogotá
Television shows set in Barranquilla